Stanisław Majcher (24 October 1936 – 17 November 2014) was a Polish footballer. He played in three matches for the Poland national football team in 1966. 

In 1974, he played in the National Soccer League with Toronto Polonia. He also played in the NSL All-Star match against Hajduk Split.

References

External links
 

1936 births
2014 deaths
Polish footballers
Poland international footballers
Place of birth missing
Association footballers not categorized by position
Canadian National Soccer League players
Polish expatriate footballers
Expatriate soccer players in Canada
Polish expatriate sportspeople in Canada